Killin Stone Circle (or Kinnell Stone Circle) is a prehistoric stone circle situated at the west end of Loch Tay near the village of Killin, Stirling, Scotland. It is a scheduled monument.

Location
The stone circle is located about 0.5 miles east of Killin, at the western end of Loch Tay. It is situated in a pasture field immediately southwest of Kinnell House.

Description
The stone circle consists of six upright slabs, ranging in height from around 1.4 metres to 1.9 metres. The stones form a flattened circle with a diameter of around 10 metres. The stones are of dark grey schist. The two tallest stones lie next to each other on the southwest quadrant. On the top of the northernmost stone there are three cupmarks.

The stone circle is one of the more westerly examples of a large number of stone circles to be found in central Scotland, many of which consist of six stones. The good condition of this particular stone circle may be due to its position in the grounds of Kinnell House, and it may have been 'restored' in the 18th or 19th century.

See also 
 Stone circles in the British Isles and Brittany
 List of stone circles

References

Archaeological sites in Stirling (council area)
Stone circles in Stirling (council area)
Scheduled Ancient Monuments in Stirling